The Clanwilliam sandfish (Labeo seeberi) is a species of ray-finned fish in the family Cyprinidae. It is found in the Olifants River system in South Africa. It is one of South Africa's most threatened freshwater fish.

References

Labeo
Freshwater fish of South Africa
Fish described in 1911
Taxa named by John Dow Fisher Gilchrist
Taxa named by William Wardlaw Thompson
Taxonomy articles created by Polbot